The following is a list of all Let's Dance (Slovak TV series) contestants to date along with their age at the time of competing, professional partners, competition finish, number of dances, highest and lowest scores, total scores and average scores.

List of contestants

Key:
 Winner of the series
 Runner-up of the series
 Third place of the series
 Last place of the series
 Withdrew in the series
 Participating in the current series

First series

Let's Dance (Slovak TV series)
Let's Dance (Slovak TV series) contestants
Reality dancing competition contestants